Tojikobod (Tadzhikabad) is a village in central Tajikistan. It is the seat of Tojikobod District, one of the Districts of Republican Subordination.

Tojikobod is in the Vakhsh river valley and has a Köppen climate classification of Dsa and experiences wet and cold winters with dry cool summers. The town is both a river crossing and highway junction. It is part of the jamoat of Qalailabiob.

It has an elevation of 351 meters.

References

Populated places in Districts of Republican Subordination